NGC 2768 is a lenticular galaxy located in the constellation of Ursa Major. It is at a distance of 65 million light years from Earth. NGC 2768 is an example of a Seyfert galaxy, an object with a supermassive black hole at its centre. A dusty structure is encircling the centre of the galaxy, forming a knotted ring around the galaxy's brightly glowing middle. This ring lies perpendicular to the plane of NGC 2768 itself, stretching up and out of the galaxy. The dust in NGC 2768 forms an intricate network of knots and filaments.

In the centre of the galaxy are two tiny, S-shaped symmetric jets. These two flows of material travel outwards from the galactic centre along curved paths, and are masked by the tangle of dark dust lanes that spans the body of the galaxy. These jets are a sign of a very active centre, where lies a supermassive black hole. This speeds up and sucks in gas from the nearby space, creating a stream of material swirling inwards towards the black hole known as an accretion disc. This disk throws off material in very energetic outbursts, creating structures like the jets.

NGC 2768 has had one observed Type Ib supernova, designated SN2000ds, which occurred far from the nuclear region.

Gallery

References

External links 
 

Lenticular galaxies
Seyfert galaxies
Ursa Major (constellation)
2768
025915